Asahel Thomson (April 16, 1790 – May 2, 1866) was an American physician and politician.

Thomson, the son of Jonathan and Eunice (Fitch) Thomson, was born in Farmington, Connecticut, April 16, 1790.  He graduated from Yale College in 1810.  After his graduation, he taught two years in the Ellsworth Academy, Sharon, Connecticut, and a third year in the East Windsor Academy.  In the fall of 1813, he became a private tutor in Woodlawn, Virginia, in the family of Lawrence Lewis, Esq.

In the spring of 1815 he commenced the study of medicine with Dr. Eli Todd, of Farmington, attending the medical lectures of that and the following winters, at Yale Medical School. He then began the practice of medicine in his native town, and continued it until his death.

He was a member of the Connecticut State Legislature, in 1850, and again in 1858. He received the honorary degree of M. D. from Yale College, in 1859.  He died at Farmington, May 2, 1866, aged 76 years.

External links

1790 births
1866 deaths
People from Farmington, Connecticut
Yale School of Medicine alumni
Members of the Connecticut General Assembly
19th-century American politicians
Yale College alumni